Serra do Navio, (Mountain range of the Ship) is a municipality located in the center of the state of Amapá in Brazil. Its population is 5,488 (2020 est.) and its area is 7,713 km². In the 1947, Manganese was discovered in the area. Serra do Navio was built as a planned city to house the workers. On 22 June 1993, the capital of the municipality was changed from Água Branca do Amapari to Serra do Novio.

History 
In the 1947, Manganese was discovered in the area. ICOMI was given the concession to exploit the mines, however the scale of the operation was such, that Bethlehem Steel Company was given a 49% stake in 1950. The Amapá Railway, and two towns for the workers were constructed: Serra do Navio and Vila Amazonas near Santana where a harbour was built. Serra do Navio was built according to North-American standards and was considered a model town.

During the 1980s, the mine produced about 1,000,000 tons of ore, however Bethlehem Steel wanted to end the cooperation, because the deposits were being exhausted. The contract was originally set to end in 2003, however in 1996, Bethlehem Steel decided to end the contract.

The closing of the main mine, led to a steep decrease in population, and the appearance of a ghost town. Smaller mines still operate in the region. Other economic activities include agriculture, and forestry.

Serra do Navio is located on the BR-210 highway. The municipality is subdivided in two districts: The town of Serra do Navio and Cachaço.

Nature 
The municipality contains 7.83% of the  Amapá State Forest, a sustainable use conservation unit established in 2006.

Notable people
 Fernanda Takai (1975), singer and guitarist

Climate

References

External links
Official website (in Portuguese)
 

Manganese mines in Brazil
Municipalities in Amapá
Planned cities in Brazil
Populated places in Amapá